Kamenný Újezd may refer to places in the Czech Republic:

Kamenný Újezd (České Budějovice District), a municipality and village in the South Bohemian Region
Kamenný Újezd (Rokycany District), a municipality and village in the Plzeň Region

See also
12833 Kamenný Újezd, an asteroid